Belfast Cromac was a constituency of the Parliament of Northern Ireland.

Boundaries
Belfast Cromac was a borough constituency comprising part of southern Belfast.  It was created in 1929 when the House of Commons (Method of Voting and Redistribution of Seats) Act (Northern Ireland) 1929 introduced first past the post elections throughout Northern Ireland.

Belfast Cromac was created by the division of Belfast South into four new constituencies.  It survived unchanged, returning one member of Parliament, until the Parliament of Northern Ireland was temporarily suspended in 1972, and then formally abolished in 1973.

Politics
In common with other seats in south Belfast, the constituency was strongly unionist.  It was always won by Unionist candidates, although labour movement and independent unionist candidates often contested it.  All but its last MP died in office.

Members of Parliament

Election results

At the 1933 Northern Ireland general election, Anthony Babington was elected unopposed.

At the 1958 Northern Ireland general election, William Morgan was elected unopposed.

References

Constituencies of the Northern Ireland Parliament
Constituencies of the Northern Ireland Parliament in Belfast
Northern Ireland Parliament constituencies established in 1929
Northern Ireland Parliament constituencies disestablished in 1973